Chitgar Metro Station is a station in Tehran Metro Line 5. It is located north of Tehran-Karaj Freeway and near Chitgar Park. It is between Azadi Stadium Metro Station and Iran Khodro Metro Station.

References

Tehran Metro stations